The red junglefowl (Gallus gallus) is a tropical bird in the family Phasianidae. It ranges across much of Southeast Asia and parts of South Asia. It was formerly known as the Bankiva or Bankiva Fowl. It is the species that gave rise to the chicken (Gallus gallus domesticus); the grey junglefowl, Sri Lankan junglefowl and green junglefowl have also contributed genetic material to the gene pool of the  chicken.

Evidence from the molecular level derived from whole-genome sequencing revealed that the chicken was domesticated from red junglefowl about 8,000 years ago, with this domestication event involving multiple maternal origins. Since then, their domestic form has spread around the world where they are kept by humans for their meat, eggs, and companionship.

Taxonomy and systematics 

Numerous subspecies of Gallus gallus exist, including:
 G. g. gallus – from India, Bangladesh, Southeast Asia
 G. g. bankiva – from Java and Sumatra
 G. g. jabouillei – from Vietnam
 G. g. murghi – from Bangladesh, India and Pakistan 
 G. g. spadiceus – from Myanmar and Thailand
 G. g. domesticus — Domestic chicken

Description 
The nominate race of red junglefowl has a mix of feather colours, with orange, brown, red, gold, grey, white, olive and even metallic green plumage. There are 14 tail feathers. A moult in June changes the bird's plumage to an eclipse pattern, which lasts through October. The male eclipse pattern includes a black feather in the middle of the back and small red-orange plumes spread across the body. Female eclipse plumage is generally indistinguishable from the plumage at other seasons, but the moulting schedule is the same as that of males.

Compared to the more familiar domestic chicken, the red junglefowl has a much smaller body mass (around  lbs (1 kg) in females and  lbs (1.5 kg) in males) and is brighter in coloration. Junglefowl are also behaviourally different from domestic chickens, being naturally very shy of humans compared to the much tamer domesticated subspecies.

Sexual dimorphism
Male junglefowl are significantly larger than females and have brightly coloured decorative feathers. The male's tail is composed of long, arching feathers that initially look black, but shimmer with blue, purple, and green in direct light. He also has long, golden hackle feathers on his neck and on his back. The female's plumage is typical of this family of birds in being cryptic and adapted for camouflage. She alone looks after the eggs and chicks. She also has a very small comb and wattles (fleshy ornaments on the head that signal good health to rivals and potential mates) compared to the males.

During their mating season, the male birds announce their presence with the well known "cock-a-doodle-doo" call or crowing.  Within flocks, only dominant males crow. Male red junglefowl have a shorter crowing sound than domestic roosters; the call cuts off abruptly at the end. This serves both to attract potential mates and to make other male birds in the area aware of the risk of fighting a breeding competitor. A spur on the lower leg just behind and above the foot serves in such fighting. Their call structure is complex and they have distinctive alarm calls for aerial and ground predators to which others react appropriately.

Genetics

Orthology
G. gallus has three transferrins, all of which cluster closely with other vertebrates' orthologs.

Distribution and habitat
The range of the wild form stretches from India, Nepal and Bangladesh in the west, and  eastwards across  southern China, to Indochina; south/southeast into Malaysia, Singapore, the Philippines, and Indonesia. Junglefowl/Chickens were one of three main animals (along with domesticated pigs and dogs) carried by early Austronesian peoples from Island Southeast Asia in their voyages to the islands of Oceania in prehistory, starting around 5,000 years  BP . Today, their modern descendants are found throughout Micronesia, Melanesia, and Polynesia.

Red junglefowl prefer disturbed habitats and edges, both natural and human-created. Apparently the forage and thick cover in these sorts of areas are attractive to junglefowl, especially nesting females. Junglefowl use both deforested and regenerating forests, and often are found near human settlements or areas of regrowth from slash-and-burn cultivation. Areas burned to promote bamboo growth also attract junglefowl, with edible bamboo seeds more available. In some areas, red junglefowl are absent from silvicultural and rubber plantations; elsewhere, they will occur in both tea plant and palm oil plantations. In the state of Selangor, Malaysia, palm foliage provides suitable cover; palm nut fruit provides adequate food, as well as insects (and their larvae) within, and adjacent to, the trees.  The palms also offer an array of roost sites, from the low perches (~4 m) favored by females with chicks to the higher perches (up to 12 m) used by other adults.

Red junglefowl drink surface water when it is available, but they apparently do not require it.  Birds in North-Central India visit water holes frequently during the dry season, although not all junglefowl on the subcontinent live close enough to water to do so; population densities may thus be lower, where surface water is limited.

Behaviour and ecology

Red junglefowl regularly bathe in dust to keep the right balance of oil in their plumage. The dust absorbs extra oil and subsequently falls off.

Flight in these birds is almost purely confined to reaching their roosting areas at sunset in trees or any other high and relatively safe places free from ground predators, and for escape from immediate danger through the day.

Dominant male junglefowl appear to defend a territory against other dominant males, and the size of the territories has been inferred based on the proximity of roosts. Beebe concluded that territories were rather small, especially as compared to some of the pheasants with which he was familiar. Within flocks, male red junglefowl exhibit dominance hierarchies and dominant males tend to have larger combs than subordinate males. Red junglefowl typically live in flocks of one to a few males and several females. Males are more likely to occur alone than are females.

Breeding 

Males make a food-related display called "tidbitting", performed upon finding food in the presence of a female. The display is composed of coaxing, cluck-like calls, and eye-catching bobbing and twitching motions of the head and neck. During the performance, the male repeatedly picks up and drops the food item with his beak. The display usually ends when the hen takes the food item either from the ground or directly from the male's beak. Eventually, they sometimes mate.

In many areas, red junglefowl breed during the dry portion of the year, typically winter or spring. This is true in parts of India, Nepal, Thailand, Vietnam, and Laos. However, year-round breeding by red junglefowl has been documented in palm-oil plantations in Malaysia and also may occur elsewhere. During the laying period, red junglefowl females lay an egg every day. Eggs take 21 days to develop. Chicks fledge in about 4 to 5 weeks, and at 12 weeks old they are chased out of the group by their mother — at which point they start a new group or join an existing one. Sexual maturity is reached at 5 months, with females taking slightly longer than males to reach maturity.

Dominant males attempt to maintain exclusive reproductive access to females, though females chose to mate with subordinate males about 40% of the time in a free-ranging feral flock in San Diego, California.

Diet 
Red junglefowl are attracted to areas with ripe fruit or seeds, including fruit plantations, fields of domestic grain, and stands of bamboo. Although junglefowl typically eat fallen fruits and seeds on the ground, they occasionally forage in trees by perching on branches and feeding on hanging fruit. Fruits and seeds of scores of plant species have been identified from junglefowl crops, along with leaves, roots, and tubers. In addition, red junglefowl capture a wide variety of arthropods, other invertebrates, and vertebrates such as small lizards. Even mammalian faeces may be consumed. Many of these items are taken opportunistically as the birds forage, although some arthropods, such as termites, are taken in large quantities; about 1,000 individual termites have been found in a single crop. Plant materials constitute a higher proportion of the diet of adult red junglefowl than do arthropods and other animals. In contrast, chicks eat mostly adult and larval insects, earthworms, and only occasional plant material.

Relationship to humans

Chickens were created when red junglefowl were domesticated for human use around 8,000 years ago as subspecies Gallus gallus domesticus. They are now a major source of food for humans. However, undomesticated red junglefowl still represent an important source of meat and eggs in their endemic range. The undomesticated form is sometimes used in cock-fighting.

Timeline of domestication 
In 2012, a study examined mitochondrial DNA recovered from ancient bones from Europe, Thailand, the Pacific, and Chile, and from Spanish colonial sites in Florida and the Dominican Republic, in directly dated samples originating in Europe at 1,000 BP and in the Pacific at 3,000 BP. Chicken was primarily domesticated from red junglefowl, with subsequent genetic contributions from grey junglefowl, Sri Lankan junglefowl, and green junglefowl. Domestication occurred about 8,000 years ago, as based on molecular evidence from a common ancestor flock in the bird's natural range, and then proceeded in waves both east and west. Zoogeography and evolutionary biology points to the original domestication site of chickens as somewhere in Mainland Southeast Asia and southern China in the Neolithic. Chickens were one of the ancestral domesticated animals of the Austronesian peoples. They were transported to Taiwan and the Philippines around 5,500 to 4,500 years ago. From there, they spread outwards with the Austronesian migrations to the rest of Island Southeast Asia, Micronesia, Island Melanesia, and Polynesia in prehistoric times.

Other archaeological evidence suggests domestication date around 7,400 BP from the Chishan site, in the Hebei province of China. However, the domestication event in China has now been disputed by several studies citing unfavourable weather condition at the time. In the Ganges region of India, wild red junglefowl were being used by humans as early as 7,000 years ago. No domestic chicken remains older than 4,000 years have been identified in the Indus Valley, and the antiquity of chickens recovered from excavations at Mohenjodaro is still debated.

Hybridization
The other three members of the genus — Sri Lanka junglefowl (G. lafayetii), grey junglefowl (G. sonneratii), and the green junglefowl (G. varius) — do not usually produce fertile hybrids with the red junglefowl.  However, supporting the hypothesis of a hybrid origin, research published in 2008 found that the gene responsible for the yellow skin of the domestic chicken most likely originated in the closely related grey junglefowl and not from the red junglefowl. Similarly, a 2020 study that analysed the whole genomes of Sri Lanka junglefowl, grey junglefowl, and the green junglefowl found strong introgressive hybridisation events in different populations of indigenous village chickens. The study also shows that 71–79% of red junglefowl DNA is shared with the domestic chicken. A culturally significant hybrid between the red junglefowl and the green junglefowl in Indonesia is known as the bekisar.

Status 

Wild-type red junglefowl are thought to be facing threats due to hybridisation at forest edges, where domesticated free-ranging chickens are common. Nevertheless, they are classified by the IUCN as a species of least concern.

References

External links 

 Malaysian Red Junglefowl
 Red Junglefowl: Pure-bred v/s Cross-bred
 ARKive – images and movies of the Red Junglefowl (Gallus gallus)
 BirdLife Species Factsheet
 Red Junglefowl
 View the red junglefowl genome in Ensembl
 
 Gallus bankiva (illustration) in Sir William Jardine, The natural history of gallinaceous birds: Vol. I., published by W. H. Lizars, and Stirling and Kenney, 1834; at Google Books.
 Reference guide to the four species of the genus Gallus, commonly known as junglefowl. Contains information and photographs of each of the species
 Ancestors of chickens studied for conservation; 7 August 2008; The Economic Times, Times of India

red junglefowl
Birds of India
Birds of Bangladesh
Birds of Nepal
Birds of Eastern Himalaya
Birds of South China
Birds of Southeast Asia
red junglefowl
red junglefowl